Olena Umanets (born 3 September 1990) is a Ukrainian handball player for HC Gomel and the Ukrainian national team.

References

1990 births
Living people
Ukrainian female handball players
Sportspeople from Uzhhorod